Wurzburger is a variety of white grape.

Wurzburger (or Würzburger) may also refer to:

People 
 Debby Wurzburger (born 1969), Canadian competitive swimmer 
 Walter Wurzburger (1920–2002), rabbi and leader of Modern Orthodox Judaism

Buildings 
 Würzburger Hofbräu, a brewery in Würzburg, Germany
 Würzburger Residenz, a palace in Würzburg, Germany

Other uses 
 Würzburger Trap, a chess opening trap in the Vienna Gambit
 Würzburger FV, a German association football club from the city of Würzburg
 Würzburger Kickers, a German association football club playing in Würzburg, Bavaria
 Würzburger Stein, a vineyard in the German wine region of Franconia